Vasas Sport Club is a professional football club based in Budapest, Hungary.

Managers
 Vilmos Kertész (1926–30)
 Tibor Gallowich (1941–43, 1945)
 Béla Guttmann (1945)
 Tibor Gallowich (1948)
 Rudolf Jeny (1951–52)
 Lajos Baróti (1953–57)
 Rudolf Illovszky (1957–63, 1965)
 Lajos Csordás (1966–67)
 Rudolf Illovszky (1967–69)
 József Albert (1970)
 Ferenc Machos (1970–72)
 Lajos Baróti (1972–74)
 Rudolf Illovszky (1974–77)
 Kálmán Mészöly (1978–80)
 Dezső Bundzsák (1980–82)
 Kálmán Mészöly (1983–84)
 Rudolf Illovszky (1984–86)
 István Kisteleki (1986–88)
 Kálmán Mészöly (1988–89)
 Imre Gellei (1991–92)
 Kálmán Mészöly (1993–94)
 Rudolf Illovszky (1995)
 Imre Gellei (1995–99)
 András Komjáti (1999–00)
 György Mezey (July 2000 – Nov 00)
 Péter Bozsik (2001)
 András Komjáti (2001)
 László Kiss (Jan 2002 – April 2)
 Barnabás Tornyi (April 2002 – June 2)
 Sándor Egervári (2004–05)
 Attila Pintér (Dec 2005 – June 6)
 Géza Mészöly (July 2006 – Dec 09)
 Giovanni Dellacasa (Dec 2009 – Oct 10)
 András Komjáti (Oct 2010 – Aug 11)
 Marijan Vlak (2011–12)
 Flórián Urbán (Jan 2012 – April 12)
 Marijan Vlak (April 2012 – June 12)
 Quim Machado (June 2012 – Sept 12)
 Gábor Szapor (Sept 2012 – Dec 12)
 Dirk Berger (2013)
 Károly Szanyó (2014–15)
 Antal Simon (2015)
 Michael Oenning (2016–2018)
 Károly Kis (2018)
 István Ferenczi (caretaker) (2018)
 Károly Szanyó(12 November 2018–31 December 2019)
 Ferenc Bene jr. (3 January 2020–8 September 2020)
 Szabolcs Schindler (8 September 2020–30 May 2021)
 Attila Kuttor (1 June 2021–6 September 2022)
 Elemér Kondás (6 September 2022–present)

References

External links

Vasas SC